Vishnyovoye is a rural locality (a selo) in Verkhnedobrinskoye Rural Settlement, Zhirnovsky District, Volgograd Oblast, Russia. The population was 241 as of 2010. There are 5 streets.

Geography 
Vishnyovoye is located on Volga Upland, 87 km southeast of Zhirnovsk (the district's administrative centre) by road. Verkhnyaya Dobrinka is the nearest rural locality.

References 

Rural localities in Zhirnovsky District